Bannwart is a German surname of Swiss origin. Notable people with the surname include:

Alexander Bannwart (1880–1959), Swiss-American businessman
Roman Bannwart (1919–2010), Swiss Roman Catholic theologian, priest, and musician
Stéphanie Bannwart (born 1991), Swiss volleyball player
Walter Bannwart (born 1927), Swiss footballer

See also
Alfred Bannwarth (1903–1970), German neurologist 

German-language surnames
Swiss-German surnames